Cerotainiops is a genus of robber flies in the family Asilidae. There are about six described species in Cerotainiops.

Species
There are about six described species.
 Cerotainiops abdominalis Brown, 1897
 Cerotainiops kernae Martin, 1959
 Cerotainiops lucyae Martin, 1959
 Cerotainiops mcclayi Martin, 1959
 Cerotainiops omus Pritchard, 1942
 Cerotainiops wilcoxi Pritchard, 1942

References

Further reading

External links

 
 
 

Asilidae genera